The King's Academy is a private, Christian junior and senior high school in Sunnyvale, California, US. It is a member of the Association of Christian Schools International and the 
Western Association of Schools and Colleges. It was founded in 1991 and is housed on the former campus of Sunnyvale High School.

Student Body 
Total enrollment is just over 950 students, about 60% high school students and 40% junior high. In the 2016–2018 school year, about 42% of students were Asian, 36% White, 12% Multi-Racial, 5% Hispanic/Latino, 2% Black and 1% Other. There were also 22 international students.

Courses 
The school offers 18 Advanced Placement courses.

The King's Academy has 9 departments.

 Bible
 Computer Science & Engineering
 English
 Mathematics
 Physical Education
 Science
 Social Studies
 Visual and Performing Arts (which includes)
 Art
 Dance
 Music
 Theater
 World Languages

Music 
The King's Academy offers the following music courses:

 Choir / Concert Choir
 Percussion Ensemble
 Wind Ensemble
 Strings / String Ensemble / String Orchestra
 Jazz

Language courses
The King's Academy offers the following language courses: (An H Indicates it as an honors class)

 French (1, 2, 3, 4, AP)
 Mandarin (1, 2, 3, 4, AP Chinese Language)
 Spanish (1, 2, 2H, 3, 3H, 4, AP)
 American Sign Language (Year 1, Year 2)

Sports 
, the school has programs in baseball, basketball, cross country, dance, diving, drill team, flag football, football, golf, soccer, softball, squash, swimming, tennis, track and field, ultimate frisbee, volleyball, water polo, and weightlifting. In the mid-2010s, the head football coach was Michael Johnson, former assistant coach of the San Francisco 49ers. In 2017, former professional Canadian football player, Pete Lavorato took over as head football coach.
Relief pitcher, Joe Biagini played at the school in the mid-2000s.

References 

Private high schools in California
Private middle schools in California
Education in Sunnyvale, California
Educational institutions established in 1991
1991 establishments in California